Lars Kagg (1 May 1595 – 19 November 1661) was a Swedish count and military officer. He was a political ally of King Gustavus Adolphus of Sweden, a member of the Privy Council of Sweden and Field Marshal during the Thirty Years' War.

Kagg was born at the Kiellstorp estate in Örslösa parish in Skaraborg, now Västra Götaland County.  He was the son of Chamberlain Nils Mathisson Kagg. In 1609, at the age of fourteen, he was taken to the court of King Charles IX of Sweden, where he formed a lifelong relationship with Crown Prince Gustav Adolph.

In 1626, he became deputy governor of Narva and Ivangorod in Swedish Ingria. In 1628,  he became colonel of in the Jönköping infantry regiment. In 1631, he became commander in Brandenburg an der Havel and Spandau. In 1632, he became governor of the city of Magdeburg.  He was made Lord High Constable of Sweden in 1660.

In 1647, Kagg acquired  Kaggeholms gård, an estate on the island of Helgö situated in Lake Mälaren, today the site of  Kaggeholm Castle (Kaggeholms slott).

References

External links
Kaggeholms slott

1595 births
1661 deaths
Field marshals of Sweden
Swedish nobility
Members of the Privy Council of Sweden
17th-century Swedish politicians
17th-century Swedish military personnel